Business Lady was an American, California-based noise rock and self-described steampunk band. They were known for their chaotic live shows and eccentric costumes. In August 2005, the band completed a full tour of the United States. Their album, Torture Footage was released on Load Records in the spring 2007.

Lineup 
Most recent members:
 Tara Barnes - bass, vocals. Formerly of Durga, currently tours with Carla Bozulich.
 Tobyn Maccormick - guitar, vocals. Formerly of The See-Thru
 Paul Morgan - drums. Formerly of The See-Thru, current member of Vholtz.

Past members:
 Michael (Mikey) McCardle - vocals, keyboard.
 Donovan Skirvin- guitar

Releases 
 Torture Footage CD on Load Records (2007)
 Split 12" with Rose for Bohdan on Half Adder Press (2005)
 Putting Out a Record Split 7" with  Hustler White on Hello Asshole Records (2005)
 Skull Bashing 7" on Pacific Rock Records (2005)
 Self-released demo CD (2004)

External links 
 Business Lady's website
 Business Lady's myspace
 San Diego Reader review of Houston show
 Interview with Aural Minority

American noise rock music groups
Punk rock groups from California